TVW is Washington's public affairs network, providing gavel-to-gavel coverage of Washington State Legislature sessions and coverage of the Washington State Supreme Court and public affairs events. It is widely considered the model state level equivalent of C-SPAN. TVW was founded in 1993 by Stan Marshburn and Denny Heck, who was formerly Chief of Staff to Governor Booth Gardner, who served as the host of TVW show Inside Olympia, and who would later represent Washington in the United States House of Representatives, after which he would go on to serve as the Lieutenant Governor of the state.

The channel is available via cable throughout Washington state, and as a subchannel on Tacoma PBS member station KBTC.

In 2017 TVW partnered with Central Washington University to add live and recorded "world-class speakers and cultural events" to its programming.

References

External links
 Official site

Television stations in Washington (state)
Legislature broadcasters in the United States
Commercial-free television networks
Washington State Legislature
Television channels and stations established in 1993